MacBryde is a surname of Irish origin. The name means "Son of [the servant of] Brigid". Brigid was the foundress of several monasteries of nuns. Notable people with the surname include:
 Jack MacBryde
 Robert MacBryde
 Olga Herrera-MacBryde

See also

 MacBride (disambiguation)
 McBryde (disambiguation)
 McBride (disambiguation)

References